West Brandywine Township is a township in Chester County, Pennsylvania, United States. The population was 7,394 at the 2010 census.

History
The Hatfield-Hibernia Historic District was listed on the National Register of Historic Places in 1984.

Per the township government's logo, the township was incorporated in 1844. West Brandywine Township

Geography

Transportation

U.S. Route 322, Pennsylvania Route 82 and Pennsylvania Route 340 are the numbered roads serving West Brandywine Township. US 322 follows Horseshoe Pike along a northwest-southeast alignment across the northern and eastern portions of the township. PA 82 follows South Manor Road along a north-south alignment through the middle of the township. PA 340 follows Kings Highway along an east-west alignment along the southern border of the township.

Demographics

At the 2010 census, the township was 92.0% non-Hispanic White, 3.5% Black or African American, 0.1% Native American, 0.9% Asian, and 1.0% were two or more races. 2.6% of the population were of Hispanic or Latino ancestry.

As of the census of 2000, there were 7,153 people, 2,552 households, and 2,003 families living in the township.  The population density was 534.5 people per square mile (206.4/km).  There were 2,610 housing units at an average density of 195.0/sq mi (75.3/km).  The racial makeup of the township was 95.39% White, 3.27% African American, 0.14% Native American, 0.39% Asian, 0.27% from other races, and 0.55% from two or more races. Hispanic or Latino of any race were 0.70% of the population.

There were 2,552 households, out of which 38.4% had children under the age of 18 living with them, 68.8% were married couples living together, 6.0% had a female householder with no husband present, and 21.5% were non-families. 17.6% of all households were made up of individuals, and 8.7% had someone living alone who was 65 years of age or older.  The average household size was 2.78 and the average family size was 3.17.

In the township the population was spread out, with 27.1% under the age of 18, 5.6% from 18 to 24, 30.1% from 25 to 44, 23.6% from 45 to 64, and 13.7% who were 65 years of age or older.  The median age was 39 years. For every 100 females, there were 97.1 males.  For every 100 females age 18 and over, there were 94.2 males.

The median income for a household in the township was $62,500, and the median income for a family was $69,514. Males had a median income of $46,558 versus $31,362 for females. The per capita income for the township was $25,211.  About 2.6% of families and 3.7% of the population were below the poverty line, including 4.6% of those under age 18 and 1.0% of those age 65 or over.

References

External links

West Brandywine Township

Townships in Chester County, Pennsylvania
Townships in Pennsylvania